The Chichester by-election was held on 6 November 1958 when the incumbent Conservative MP Lancelot Joynson-Hicks succeeded to a peerage.  It was won by the Conservative candidate, Walter Loveys.

References

By-elections to the Parliament of the United Kingdom in West Sussex constituencies
Chichester by-election
Chichester by-election
Chichester by-election
20th century in Sussex
Chichester